"Fuck My Cousin" is a song by American rapper Lil Zay Osama, released on March 14, 2022 as the lead single from his mixtape Trench Baby 3 (2022). It was produced by Fatman Beatzz and Vito. An official remix of the song titled "Fuck My Cousin, Pt. II" was released on July 29, 2022 and features American rapper Lil Durk.

Composition
A drill song, it finds Lil Zay Osama rapping about his desire for vengeance against the "opps", including his own cousin. On the remix, Lil Durk asserts his position in the Chicago streets, declaring toward the end of the song, "In the 'Raq, ask the streets, I'm bigger than Yeezy, I'm the G.O.A.T. (Bigger than Yeezy)".

Charts

References

2022 singles
2022 songs
Drill songs
Warner Records singles